Hugh R. Adair (August 29, 1889  – January 18, 1971) was a legislator, lieutenant governor, and justice of the Montana Supreme Court. He served on the court as associate justice from 1943 to 1946, as chief justice from 1947 to 1956, and again as an associate justice from 1957 until 1968.

Adair was born in Trego County, Kansas. He graduated from the University of Kansas at Lawrence in 1913 with an LL.B and was admitted to the State Bar of Montana on January 26, 1914.

Adair served in the Montana House of Representatives from 1931 through 1937 when he took office as lieutenant governor. In 1939 he served as president of the Montana Senate.

He was elected in 1942 to the Supreme Court  as an associate justice and became chief justice in 1947. He served in that capacity until January 7, 1957 when he chose to return to Associate Justice status because, due to the salary structure of the court, the pay would be $2,000 more per year than continuing as chief justice. He remained at that status until his retirement in 1968.

He died in a hospital in Helena, Montana at 81 years old.

See also
List of justices of the Montana Supreme Court

References

1889 births
1971 deaths
People from Trego County, Kansas
University of Kansas alumni
Justices of the Montana Supreme Court
20th-century American judges
Montana state senators